Garden City is a town in Clark County, South Dakota, United States. The population was 33 at the 2020 census.

History
Garden City was first settled in 1882, but it was in 1887 that Garden City was established as this was the year that the Chicago Milwaukee & St. Paul Railroad came  through. The town was named from the site's garden-like setting.

Geography

Garden City is located at  (44.957859, -97.579714).

Garden City has been assigned the ZIP code 57236 and the FIPS place code 23460.

Climate

Demographics

2010 census
As of the census of 2010, there were 53 people, 21 households, and 17 families residing in the town. The racial makeup of the town was 94.3% White and 5.7% from two or more races. Hispanic or Latino of any race were 5.7% of the population.

There were 21 households, of which 28.6% had children under the age of 18 living with them, 61.9% were married couples living together, 9.5% had a female householder with no husband present, 9.5% had a male householder with no wife present, and 19.0% were non-families. 19.0% of all households were made up of individuals, and 4.8% had someone living alone who was 65 years of age or older. The average household size was 2.52 and the average family size was 2.82.

The median age in the town was 48.2 years. 26.4% of residents were under the age of 18; 1.8% were between the ages of 18 and 24; 11.4% were from 25 to 44; 39.6% were from 45 to 64; and 20.8% were 65 years of age or older. The gender makeup of the town was 52.8% male and 47.2% female.

2000 census
As of the census of 2000, there were 72 people, 31 households, and 19 families residing in the town. The population density was 182.1 people per square mile (69.5/km2). There were 46 housing units at an average density of 116.3 per square mile (44.4/km2). The racial makeup of the town was 100.00% White.

There were 31 households, out of which 25.8% had children under the age of 18 living with them, 54.8% were married couples living together, and 38.7% were non-families. 38.7% of all households were made up of individuals, and 25.8% had someone living alone who was 65 years of age or older. The average household size was 2.32 and the average family size was 3.16.

In the town, the population was spread out, with 26.4% under the age of 18, 2.8% from 18 to 24, 25.0% from 25 to 44, 19.4% from 45 to 64, and 26.4% who were 65 years of age or older. The median age was 42 years. For every 100 females, there were 111.8 males. For every 100 females age 18 and over, there were 112.0 males.

The median income for a household in the town was $31,875, and the median income for a family was $38,750. Males had a median income of $23,750 versus $21,250 for females. The per capita income for the town was $14,014. There were 9.5% of families and 12.5% of the population living below the poverty line, including no under eighteens and 33.3% of those over 64.

References

Towns in Clark County, South Dakota
Towns in South Dakota